
Year 466 BC was a year of the pre-Julian Roman calendar. At the time, it was known as the Year of the Consulship of Priscus and Albinus (or, less frequently, year 288 Ab urbe condita). The denomination 466 BC for this year has been used since the early medieval period, when the Anno Domini calendar era became the prevalent method in Europe for naming years.

Events 
 By place 
 Greece 
 Cimon carries the war against Persia into Asia Minor and wins the Battle of the Eurymedon in Pamphylia. This is a decisive defeat of the Persians as Cimon's land and sea forces capture the Persian camp and destroy or capture the entire Persian fleet of 200 triremes (manned by Phoenicians). Many new allies of Athens are now recruited, such as the trading city of Phaselis on the Lycian-Pamphylian border.

 Italy 
 The Tyrant, Thrasybulus, is driven out by the citizens of Syracuse, Sicily. The city moves to a democratic system of government.
 The Greek colony of Taras, in Magna Graecia, is defeated by the native population of Apulia. As a result, the Tarentine monarchy falls, with the installation of a democracy.

Births

Deaths 
King Xerxes I of Persia.

References